Cincinnati and Suburban Telephone Company Building is a registered historic building in Cincinnati, Ohio. It was designed by Harry Hake, and listed in the National Register on April 20, 1995.

The Cincinnati Bell Company opened its building at Seventh and Elm streets in 1931. At that time, it housed the world's longest straight switchboard, with 88 operator positions.

The building was built in such a way as to protect the city's phone network.  With a push of a button heavy steel doors will lock and metal covers will spring up over the windows on the lower floors.

Representations of rotary telephones are carved into the limestone frieze on the building's facade. Continuing the communication motif, still other reliefs depict a runner, telephone inventor Alexander Graham Bell, and nautical flag signals.

The general contractor was the J. and F. Harig Co., Cincinnati, Ohio.

References 

Buildings and structures in Cincinnati
National Register of Historic Places in Cincinnati
Industrial buildings and structures in Ohio
Telephone exchange buildings
Industrial buildings and structures on the National Register of Historic Places in Ohio
Telecommunications buildings on the National Register of Historic Places
Cincinnati Bell
Industrial buildings completed in 1931
1931 establishments in Ohio
Cincinnati Local Historic Landmarks